Peter Andersson (born March 20, 1973 in Boxholm, Sweden) is a music composer within the ambient, noise, industrial, electronic and experimental genre.

His projects are Raison D'être, Stratvm Terror, Necrophorus, Atomine Elektrine, Yantra Atmospheres, Panzar, Bocksholm, Svasti-ayanam, Cataclyst, Grismannen.  Besides his music activities he is mostly interested in film, art, Tibetan Buddhism and meditation.

Stratvm Terror
Stratvm Terror is an industrial noise project of Peter Andersson, first appearing in 1993. For the project, he was joined by Tobias Larsson. After a few tapes and four CD releases this project has almost reached the same acclaimed status as Raison d'être. Stratvm Terror offers harsh, droning, aggressive and loud frequencies, though it could be considered more musical in earlier albums.

References

External links 
 Interview with Peter Andersson
 

1973 births
Ambient musicians
Industrial musicians
Living people
Noise musicians
Ragtime composers
Swedish electronic musicians
Experimental musicians
Power electronics musicians